Molybdenum dichloride describes chemical compounds with the empirical formula MoCl2. At least two forms are known, and both have attracted much attention from academic researchers because of the unexpected structures seen for these compounds and the fact that they give rise to hundreds of derivatives.  The form discussed here is Mo6Cl12.  The other molybdenum(II) chloride is potassium octachlorodimolybdate.

Structure
Rather than adopting a close-packed structure typical of metal dihalides, e.g., cadmium chloride, molybdenum(II) chloride forms a structure based on clusters.  Molybdenum(II), which is a rather large ion, prefers to form compounds with metal-metal bonds, i.e. metal clusters.  In fact all "lower halides" (i.e. where halide/M ratio is <4) in the "early transition metal series (Ti, V, Cr, Mn triads) do. The species Mo6Cl12 is polymeric, consisting of  cubic Mo6Cl84+ clusters interconnected by chloride ligands that bridge from cluster to cluster.  This material converts readily to salts of the dianion [Mo6Cl14]2−.  In this anion, each Mo bears one terminal chloride but is otherwise part of an Mo6 octahedron embedded inside a cube defined by eight chloride centers.  Thus, the coordination environment of each Mo is four triply bridging chloride ligands, four Mo neighbors, and one terminal Cl.  The cluster has 24e−, four being provided by each Mo2+.
]

Synthesis and reactions
Mo6Cl12 is prepared by the reaction of molybdenum(V) chloride with molybdenum metal:
12 MoCl5  + 18 Mo  → 5 Mo6Cl12
This reaction proceeds via the intermediacy of MoCl3 and MoCl4, which also are reduced by the presence of excess Mo metal.  The reaction is conducted in a tube furnace at 600–650 °C.

Once isolated, Mo6Cl12 undergoes many reactions with retention of the Mo612+ core.  Heating in concentrated HCl gives (H3O)2[Mo6Cl14].  The terminal chloride ligands, labeled "ausser" are readily exchanged:
(H3O)2[Mo6Cl14]  + 6 HI  → (H3O)2[Mo6Cl8I6]  +  6  HCl

Under more forcing conditions, all 14 ligands can be exchanged, to giving salts of [Mo6Br14]2− and [Mo6I14]2−.

.

Related clusters

A variety of clusters are structurally related to [Mo6Cl14]2−.  The tungsten analogue is known.  Ta and Nb form related clusters where halides are bridge edges of the Ta6 octahedron vs faces.  The resulting formula is [Ta6Cl18]4−.

Sulfido and selenido derivatives are also well studied.   [Re6Se8Cl6]4− has the same number of valence electrons as does [Mo6Cl14]2−.

The Mo-S clusters Mo6S8L6, analogues of the "Chevrel phases", have been prepared by the reaction of sulfide sources with Mo6Cl12 in the presence of donor ligands L.

References

Chlorides
Molybdenum halides
Molybdenum(II) compounds